Drifting is a 2021 Hong Kong drama film directed and written by Jun Li. Starring Francis Ng, Loletta Lee and Tse Kwan-ho, the film is based on a 2012 actual court case involving homeless people in Sham Shui Po.

The film was selected for Big Screen Competition at 2021 International Film Festival Rotterdam, and made its Asian premiere at the 45th Hong Kong International Film Festival before its theatrical release on 3 June 2021.

Plot 
Ho Kei-fai ("Fai") is released from prison and returns to Tung Chau Street in Sham Shui Po, one of the poorest districts in the territory, and rejoins his fellow street sleepers. One day, without prior notice, the police and cleaners vacate their sleeping place and forcibly throw their belongings into a rubbish truck, despite their protest.

The group manages to build wooden huts under a nearby flyover as their new home. Social worker Miss Ho assists the street sleepers to file a lawsuit against the government, demanding both compensation for their loss and an official apology.

Among the residents of the wooden huts are drug addicts: Master, a Vietnamese boat person; Dai Shing, an electrician; Chan Mui, a dish washer; and Lan, a paraplegic person. After a long wait, Chan Mui and Lan move to a public apartment while a nonverbal young man, who is given the name Muk, joins the group. Fai gradually develops a bond with Muk but eventually leaves to reunite with his family. With Ho's help, Master reconnects online with his migrated family but commits suicide afterwards.

With the case being publicised, the group receives unwanted spotlight that focuses on their background stories instead of the injustice they are suffering. Amidst a long legal procedure, the government proposes a settlement. Fai is the only one who insists on an apology although all other members of the group are happy to accept the meagre compensation. This means the legal procedures have to continue.

One day, the police investigates an armed crime and discovers illegal arms inside the wooden huts, which causes them to announce a plan to demolish the huts. The street sleepers berate Fai for his stubbornness, but he stands his ground. As the deadline is approaching, they have no choice but to relocate. Left behind, Fai vaguely bids farewell to Miss Ho when she comes by with supplies for him. 

Facing the coming winter nights alone and with the bleak prospect that the government will never apologise, Fai imagines conversing with his deceased son (appearing in the form of Muk), where it is implied that he may have accidentally caused his son's death and was jailed for this offence. Injecting drugs for one last time, Fai then sets the wooden huts on fire with himself inside.

The film ends with a reference to an actual case that happened in 2012 and comments that street sleepers are still facing unjust treatment.

Cast
 Francis Ng as Ho Kei-fai (Fai; 何奇輝)
 Tse Kwan-ho as Master (老爺)
 Loletta Lee as Chan Mui (陳妹)
 Cecilia Choi as Social worker Ms Ho (何姑娘)
 Chu Pak-hong as Dai Shing (大勝)
 Baby Bo as Lan (蘭姑)
 Will Or as Muk (木仔)
 Yu Mo-lin as Sister Hoi (開姐)
 Cecilia Yip as Muk's mother
 Zenni Corbin as Hak (黑仔)

Production

The director and storywriter Jun Li interviewed the homeless people and wrote an article on the clearance  on 15 February 2012 when he was studying journalism. He came up with the idea of wooden houses when working on another film project in 2016, and started writing the scripts in 2018.

When the filming took place in 2019, Hong Kong was undergoing an unprecedented social movement, which inspired Li to write the current ending. Most of the scenes were shot in Sham Shui Po, and the wooden huts were a recreation of street sleepers'. The crew wanted to set the scene on Tung Chau Street where the actual clearance took place, but the application was rejected by the government, which prompted them to choose a filming site under a nearby flyover. Due to the works already done on constructing the wooden huts, the filming took place on schedule despite the social movement.

Release
The film was selected for Big Screen Competition at 2021 International Film Festival Rotterdam, and was screened at the 45th Hong Kong International Film Festival and the 23rd Far East Film Festival. It was released to the public on 3 June 2021.

Accolades

References

External links

Hong Kong drama films
2021 films
Films about homelessness
2020s Cantonese-language films
Films set in Hong Kong
Films shot in Hong Kong